Marlon Tarron McCree (born March 17, 1977) is a former American football safety. He was drafted by the Jaguars in the seventh round of the 2001 NFL Draft. He played college football at Kentucky.

McCree also played for the Houston Texans, Carolina Panthers, San Diego Chargers, and Denver Broncos. He served as an assistant defensive backs coach for the Jacksonville Jaguars in 2012.

Early years
McCree survived a tumultuous childhood in inner-city Orlando during the 1980s and 90s that saw him lose an older brother, Cameron, to leukemia. But with the guidance of family members, teachers and other mentors, McCree was able to excel at Atlantic High School in Port Orange, Florida, where he was a letterman in football, basketball, and track. A first-team, all-state member in his senior season, McCree was Atlantic's first Division I-A signee.

High school
McCree's talent shined throughout his high school career. He was first-team all-state in Class AAAA as chosen by the Florida Sportswriters Association. He was the winner of the 1995 Volusia County Helmet Award for the top defensive back in the county and the team's Most Valuable Player. McCree was also County Player of the Week seven times during his senior season as chosen by the Volusia County Quarterback Club. He served as a two year starter as strong safety and linebacker and was chosen all-county both years. His senior campaign featured 110 tackles, eight sacks, 11 caused fumbles, six fumbles recovered, four blocked kicks, a punt return for a 69 yard touchdown and a kickoff return for an 80 yard touchdown. McCree received five scholarship offers coming out of Atlantic High School: Boston College, Kansas State, University of Kentucky, Indiana State and UCF, ultimately choosing Kentucky. He was the first Division I signee from Atlantic High School and was coached by the notable Kevin Sullivan. His talent also shined in other sports where he was a two year letterman in basketball and track.

College career
McCree was a four-year letterman (1997–2000) at the University of Kentucky. A three-year starter, he arrived at Kentucky as a strong safety, but moved to linebacker midway through his redshirt freshman season. McCree's career totals included 219 tackles (46 for loss), 14.5 quarterback sacks, two interceptions, three caused fumbles and six fumble recoveries. He also led the Wildcats to two bowl appearances (1998 Outback Bowl, 1999 Music City Bowl). McCree graduated with a degree in finance.

Professional career

2001 NFL Draft
McCree was drafted in the 7th round 233rd overall of the 2001 NFL Draft by the Jacksonville Jaguars. Though unheralded, McCree immediately made an impact in training camp with Jacksonville, and assumed a starting role early in his rookie season.

Jacksonville Jaguars
McCree received significant playing time during his first two seasons, playing in all but three games, and making six interceptions in 2002.

Houston Texans
McCree was waived by the Jaguars in 2003 and was picked up by the Houston Texans. On December 21, 2003, he scored his first career touchdown, a 95-yard interception return off of the Tennessee Titans' Steve McNair.

Carolina Panthers
McCree was claimed off waivers by the Carolina Panthers prior to the 2005 NFL season, where he served as the starting free safety. McCree recorded three interceptions in the regular season, but truly made his mark in the first playoff game of his career.

On January 8, 2006, McCree played smothering defense in Carolina's first-round game against the New York Giants. His second interception of the game of New York's Eli Manning preserved a 20-0 lead, and effectively put the Panthers ahead for good. Carolina won, 23-0.

"We were always overlooked. We don't know why that is," said McCree after the victory. "We've got the third best defense in the league. Sooner or later, we'll get the respect and recognition that we deserve."

San Diego Chargers
On March 11, 2006, the San Diego Chargers signed McCree to a five-year deal through 2010.

McCree's tenure with the Chargers was defined by losing a fumble. During a January 14, 2007, playoff game against the New England Patriots, McCree had a critical fourth quarter interception with the Chargers leading, 21–13.  However, while tackling McCree following the interception, Patriots wide receiver Troy Brown managed to strip the ball away from him.  Reche Caldwell would recover for the Patriots. San Diego's defense was unable to stop New England on the drive that followed, and the Patriots scored a touchdown and a two-point conversion to tie the game at 21.  The Patriots eventually won, 24–21.

“Anytime I get the ball I am going to try and score regardless," said McCree. "Troy Brown stripped it. He made a great play, and I was trying to make a big play. (In) hindsight I don't regret it because I would never try and just go down on the (ground). I want to score.”

The following season, almost a year to the day, McCree would exact a measure of redemption. On January 13, 2008, late in the fourth quarter of a playoff game against the Indianapolis Colts, Peyton Manning was driving Indy toward what appeared to be a go-ahead score. But on third down and five, McCree delivered a vicious hit on Indianapolis wide receiver Reggie Wayne, knocking Wayne out of the game and forcing the Colts to use their final timeout. "As an emphatic hush fell over the crowd,"  wrote Jim McCabe in the Boston Globe, "the reality of the situation sank in, thanks to McCree's superb play. It was now fourth and 5 and Manning was without any timeouts or either of his prized wideouts, Marvin Harrison having left the game with a sore knee and Wayne having been shown the sideline courtesy of McCree's hit...When on the following snap Manning delivered his third straight incompletion, McCree could celebrate along with his teammates. This time, he had performed with textbook precision with a playoff game hinging on his split-second thinking."

McCree and the Chargers would advance to the AFC Championship game, where they would lose a rematch with the Patriots.

On February 28, 2008 the Chargers released McCree to allow more playing time for the younger safety, Eric Weddle.

Denver Broncos
On March 8, 2008, McCree was signed by the Denver Broncos.

Second stint with Jaguars
McCree re-signed with the Jacksonville Jaguars on June 3, 2009.  He was released on September 5, 2009.

Post-playing career
On January 17, 2012, McCree reached a deal with the Jacksonville Jaguars to return to the team as an assistant coach.

McCree was a 2015 Florida Athletic Coaches Association Hall of Fame inductee.

References

External links
 Jacksonville Jaguars bio (2012)
 Jacksonville Jaguars bio (2009)

Players of American football from Florida
American football safeties
Kentucky Wildcats football players
Jacksonville Jaguars players
Houston Texans players
Carolina Panthers players
San Diego Chargers players
Sportspeople from Volusia County, Florida
Denver Broncos players
Jacksonville Jaguars coaches
1977 births
Living people
People from Port Orange, Florida